Royal Air Force Kirmington or more simply RAF Kirmington was a Royal Air Force station located  north east of Brigg, Lincolnshire and  south west of Grimsby, Lincolnshire, England.

History

Second World War
It took its name from the village of Kirmington nearby; the most notable squadron posted there was No. 166 Squadron RAF and a memorial plaque to the members of that unit is in the parish church.
The airfield opened in January 1942

Post 1945
From February 1946 the station was put on care and maintenance until relinquished by the Air Ministry to the Ministry of Agriculture in 1953.

Current use

In 1970, after changing hands several times, Kirmington was selected as the best location for a regional airport serving the Hull, Grimsby and Scunthorpe localities and has become Humberside International Airport.

References

Citations

Bibliography

External links

Royal Air Force - Official RAF history
Air Scene UK - Memories of Sergeant Roy Keen
RAF Kirmington North Lincolnshire Airfield

Royal Air Force stations in Lincolnshire
Military units and formations established in 1942